The Tyrrell 005 is a Formula One racing car that was designed for the Tyrrell team by their Chief Designer, Derek Gardner. Only one chassis was built and Gardner designed it with a particularly short wheelbase of  specifically to suit Stewart's style and abilities.

Racing history
The 005's first race was the 1972 Austrian Grand Prix where Stewart finished seventh. Clutch failure put Stewart out of the race and out of the championship at the Italian Grand Prix. The Scotsman won the Canadian and United States Grands Prix.

Stewart raced the 005 at the 1973 Argentine Grand Prix and finished third. The Scotsman finished 2nd in the Brazilian Grand Prix. François Cevert drove the 005 in the South African Grand Prix and was not classified. Chris Amon raced the 005 at the Canadian Grand Prix and finished 10th.  Amon was scheduled to drive the 005 in the United States Grand Prix but he and Stewart withdrew after the death of Cevert during practice.

The 005 was used in the first three races of 1974 by Frenchman Patrick Depailler who finished 6th in the Argentine Grand Prix. Depailler finished 8th in the Brazilian Grand Prix and the 005's final race was the South African Grand Prix when the Frenchman finished fourth. The 005 was replaced by the Tyrrell 006.

Complete Formula One World Championship results
(key)(results in bold indicate pole position, results in italics indicate fastest lap)

1 18 points were scored using the Tyrrell 005; the other 33 points were scored using the Tyrrell 002, Tyrrell 003 and Tyrrell 004
2 6 points were scored using the Tyrrell 005; the other 76 points were scored using the Tyrrell 006
3 4 points were scored using the Tyrrell 005; the other 48 points were scored using the Tyrrell 007

References

Tyrrell Formula One cars